Roses is the third studio album by Canadian singer-songwriter Béatrice Martin, released under her stage name Cœur de pirate, on August 28, 2015.

Track listing

Charts

Weekly charts

Year-end charts

Certifications

References

External links
 

2015 albums
Cœur de pirate albums
Interscope Records albums
Cherrytree Records albums
Bravo Musique albums